Ján Strausz (16 November 1942 – 29 November 2017), nicknamed Johan after composer Johann Strauss, was a Slovak football striker who played for Jednota Košice, Dukla Prague (1965–1966), VSS Košice (1963–1965 and 1967–1975), Baník Rožňava, Tatran Prešov and Družstevník Čaňa within years 1960–1979. He overall played 261 matches and scored 115 goals at the Czechoslovak First League.

Strausz was capped once for the Czechoslovakia national football team against Romania on 30 May 1965.

References

External links 
 

1942 births
2017 deaths
People from Mukachevo
Slovak footballers
Czechoslovak footballers
Czechoslovakia international footballers
FC VSS Košice players
Dukla Prague footballers
1. FC Tatran Prešov players
Association football forwards